The Chestnut Hill East Line is a route of the SEPTA Regional Rail (commuter rail) system. The route serves the northwestern section of Philadelphia with service to Germantown, Mount Airy, and Chestnut Hill. It is one of two lines that serve Chestnut Hill, the other one being the Chestnut Hill West Line. The line is fully grade-separated.

History

The Chestnut Hill East Line is a continuation of the Reading Company's suburban services on the Chestnut Hill East Branch from Philadelphia to Germantown and Chestnut Hill. The oldest part of the line that became the Chestnut Hill East Branch was opened in 1832 by the Philadelphia, Germantown and Norristown Railroad, and later became part of the Reading system. Electrified service began on February 5, 1933.

Until 1984 Chestnut Hill East trains used the Reading Viaduct to reach Spring Garden Street and the Reading Terminal; this ended with the opening of the Center City Commuter Connection which routed the trains through the city center and on the ex-Pennsylvania Railroad part of the system. From this point the route was designated R7 Chestnut Hill East as part of SEPTA's diametrical reorganization of its lines; trains continued on to the Trenton Line. The R-number naming system was dropped on July 25, 2010. , most Chestnut Hill East Line trains continue through Center City to the Trenton Line.

SEPTA activated positive train control on the Chestnut Hill East Line on July 25, 2016.

On April 9, 2020, service on the line was suspended due to the COVID-19 pandemic, though  and  stations were still being served by other rail services. Service resumed on June 28, 2020.

Stations

The Chestnut Hill East line makes the following station stops after leaving the Center City Commuter Connection; stations indicated with a gray background are closed. All stations are located within the city of Philadelphia.

Ridership
Yearly ridership on the Chestnut Hill East Line between FY 2008–FY 2019 has remained steady around 1.4–1.6 million, save for a dip in FY 2019.

Notes

References

External links

Reading Company Routes and Mileages

SEPTA Regional Rail
Chestnut Hill, Philadelphia
Germantown, Philadelphia
Mount Airy, Philadelphia